There are five unrelated publishers with the name Pendragon Press.

The first is a British small press based in Maesteg in Wales and specialising in science fiction, fantasy, horror and weird fiction.  It is run by Christopher Teague. In 2005 the press was nominated for a British Fantasy Award for best small press.  It specialises in novellas, anthologies and short story collections.

The second is the printing division of Papworth Industries, the manufacturing arm of Papworth Village Settlement, an industrial colony for tuberculosis sufferers established by Dr Pendrill Charles Varrier-Jones in 1915.

The third specialises in books on music, musicology, and music theory.  This Pendragon Press was founded in 1972 and is located in Hillsdale, New York.

The fourth is a community newspaper publisher on Waiheke Island, New Zealand. Newspapers published by this company are Gulf News and Waiheke Weekender.

The fifth is a British small press based in North Wales.

Books published by Pendragon Press, Maesteg

 Nasty Snips, an anthology edited by Christopher Teague, 1999
 Shenanigans, a short story collection by Noel K. Hannan, 2000
 Tourniquet Heart an anthology edited by Christopher Teague, 2002
 The Ice Maiden a novella by Steve Lockley & Paul Lewis, 2004
 The Extremist and Other Tales of Conflict, a short story collection by Paul Finch, 2004
 The Mask Behind the Face, short story collection by Stuart Young, 2005
 Double Negative, a novel by Robin Gilbert, 2005
 An Occupation of Angels, a novella by Lavie Tidhar, 2005
 In the Rain with the Dead, a novel by Mark West (author), 2005
 Triquorum One, a mini-anthology edited by Christopher Teague, 2005
 Silversands, a novel by Gareth L. Powell, 2010
 Creeping Stick, a novella by Liam Ronan, 2017

Book published by Pendragon Press, Papworth Everard, Cambridge
 On the Road: The Papworth Story, by Rowland Parker, 1977

External links
 Pendragon Press (science fiction)
 Pendragon Press (music)
 Pendragon Press
 Gulf News

Book publishing companies of the United Kingdom
Book publishing companies based in New York (state)
Publishing companies established in 1972